Austin Krajicek and Nicholas Monroe were the defending champions but chose not to defend their title.

Jonathan Erlich and Santiago González won the title after defeating Ariel Behar and Gonzalo Escobar 6–3, 7–6(7–4) in the final.

Seeds

Draw

References

External links
 Main draw

Oracle Challenger Series - Houston - Men's Doubles
2019 Men's Doubles